William Foxwell Albright (May 24, 1891– September 19, 1971) was an American archaeologist, biblical scholar, philologist, and expert on ceramics. He is considered "one of the twentieth century's most influential American biblical scholars."

Biography
Albright was born on May 24, 1891, in Coquimbo, Chile, the eldest of six children of the American Evangelical Methodist missionaries Wilbur Finley Albright and Cornish-American Zephine Viola Foxwell. Albright was an alumnus of Upper Iowa University. He married Ruth Norton  in 1921 and had four sons. He received his Doctor of Philosophy degree from Johns Hopkins University in Baltimore, Maryland, in 1916 and accepted a professorship there in 1927. Albright was W. W. Spence Professor of Semitic Languages from 1930 until his retirement in 1958. He was the Director of the American School of Oriental Research in Jerusalem from 1922–1929, and 1933–1936, and did important archaeological work at sites in Palestine such as Gibeah (Tell el-Fûl, 1922) and Tell Beit Mirsim (1926, 1928, 1930, and 1932).

Albright became known to the public in 1948 for his role in the authentication of the Dead Sea Scrolls, but made his scholarly reputation as the leading theorist and practitioner of biblical archaeology, "that branch of archaeology that sheds light upon 'the social and political structure, the religious concepts and practices and other human activities and relationships that are found in the Bible or pertain to peoples mentioned in the Bible." Albright was not, however, a biblical literalist; in his Yahweh and the Gods of Canaan, for example, he argued that Yahwism and ancient Caananite religion had a reciprocal relationship, in which "both gained much in the exchange which set in about the tenth century and continued until the fifth century B.C".

Although primarily a biblical archaeologist, Albright was a polymath who made contributions in almost every field of Near Eastern studies: an example of his range is a 1953 paper, "New Light from Egypt on the Chronology and History of Israel and Judah", in which he established that Egyptian pharaoh Shoshenq I—the Biblical Shishaq—came to power somewhere between 945 and 940 BC.

A prolific author, his works in addition to Yahweh and the Gods of Canaan, include The Archaeology of Palestine: From the Stone Age to Christianity, and The Biblical Period from Abraham to Ezra. He also edited the Anchor Bible volumes on Jeremiah, Matthew, and Revelation.

Throughout his life Albright was honored with awards, honorary doctorates, and medals, and was proclaimed "Yakir Yerushalayim" (Worthy Citizen of Jerusalem)—the first time that title had been awarded to a non-Jew. He was elected a Fellow of the American Academy of Arts and Sciences in 1956. After his death on September 19, 1971, his legacy continued through the many scholars inspired by his work, who specialized in the fields pioneered by Albright. The American School of Oriental Research, Jerusalem, was renamed the Albright Institute of Archaeological Research, in honor of Albright's archeological achievements.

Historical research and hypotheses
From the 1930s until his death, he was the dean of biblical archaeologists and the acknowledged founder of the biblical archaeology movement. Coming from his background in German biblical criticism of the historicity of the biblical accounts, Albright, through his seminal work in archaeology (and his development of the standard pottery typology for Palestine and the Holy Land) concluded that the biblical accounts of Israelite history were, contrary to the dominant German biblical criticism of the day, largely accurate. This area remains widely contested among scholars. Albright's student George Ernest Wright inherited his leadership of the biblical archaeology movement, contributing definitive work at Shechem and Gezer. Albright inspired, trained and worked with the first generation of world-class Israeli archaeologists, who have carried on his work, and maintained his perspective.

Other students such as Joseph Fitzmyer, Frank Moore Cross, Raymond E. Brown, and David Noel Freedman, became international leaders in the study of the Bible and the ancient Near East, including Northwest Semitic epigraphy and paleography. John Bright, Cyrus H. McCormick Professor of Hebrew and Old Testament Interpretation at Union Seminary in Richmond (PhD, Johns Hopkins, 1940), went on to become "the first distinguished American historian of the Old Testament" and "arguably the most influential scholar of the Albright school", owing to his "distinctly American commonsense flavor, similar to that of W[illiam] James". Thus Albright and his students influenced a broad swath of American higher education from the 1940s through the 1970s, after which revisionist scholars such as T. L. Thompson, John Van Seters, Niels Peter Lemche, and Philip R. Davies developed and advanced a minimalist critique of Albright's view that archaeology supports the broad outlines of the history of Israel as presented in the Bible. Like other academic polymaths (Edmund Husserl in phenomenology and Max Weber in the fields of sociology and the sociology of religion), Albright created and advanced the discipline of biblical archaeology, which is now taught at universities worldwide and has exponents across national, cultural, and religious lines.

Influence and legacy
Albright's publication in the Annual of the American Schools of Oriental Research, 1932, of his excavations of Tell Beit Mirsim, and descriptions of the Bronze Age and Iron Age layers at the site in 1938 and 1943, marked a major contribution to the dating of sites based on ceramic typologies, which is still in use. "With this work, Albright made Israeli archaeology into a science, instead of what it had formerly been: a digging in which the details are more or less well-described in an indifferent chronological framework which is as general as possible and often wildly wrong".

As editor of the Bulletin of the American Schools of Oriental Research from 1931 to 1968, Albright influenced biblical scholarship and Palestinian archaeology. Albright advocated "biblical archaeology" in which the archaeologist's task, according to fellow biblical archaeologist William G. Dever, is "to illuminate, to understand, and, in their greatest excesses, to 'prove' the Bible." Here, Albright's American Methodist upbringing was clearly apparent. He insisted, for example, that "as a whole, the picture in Genesis is historical, and there is no reason to doubt the general accuracy of the biographical details" (i.e., of figures such as Abraham). Similarly he claimed that archaeology had proved the essential historicity of the Book of Exodus, and the conquest of Canaan as described in the Book of Joshua and the Book of Judges.

In the years since his death, Albright's methods and conclusions have been increasingly questioned. In a 1993 article for The Biblical Archaeologist, William G. Dever stated that:  [Albright's] central theses have all been overturned, partly by further advances in Biblical criticism, but mostly by the continuing archaeological research of younger Americans and Israelis to whom he himself gave encouragement and momentum... The irony is that, in the long run, it will have been the newer 'secular' archaeology that contributed the most to Biblical studies, not 'Biblical archaeology.'

Biblical scholar Thomas L. Thompson wrote that by 2002 the methods of "biblical archaeology" had also become outmoded:[Wright and Albright's] historical interpretation can make no claim to be objective, proceeding as it does from a methodology which distorts its data by selectivity which is hardly representative, which ignores the enormous lack of data for the history of the early second millennium, and which wilfully establishes hypotheses on the basis of unexamined biblical texts, to be proven by such (for this period) meaningless mathematical criteria as the "balance of probability" ...

Publications

 The Archaeology of Palestine: From the Stone Age to Christianity (1940/rev.1960)
 From the Stone Age to Christianity: Monotheism and the Historical Process, Johns Hopkins Press, 1946 
 Views of the Biblical World. Jerusalem: International Publishing Company J-m Ltd, 1959.
 Yahweh and the Gods of Canaan: An Historical Analysis of Two Contrasting Faiths (1968)
 Matthew (with C. S. Mann) in the Anchor Bible series (1971) 
 The Biblical Period from Abraham to Ezra

See also
 Biblical archaeology
 List of artifacts in biblical archaeology
 Views of the Biblical World

References

Footnotes

Bibliography

Further reading

 
 
 
 
 
 
Machinist, Peter. "William Foxwell Albright: the man and his work." In The Study of the Ancient Near East in the 21st Century: the William Foxwell Albright Centennial Conference, pp. 385-403. Winona Lake, In: Eisenbrauns, 1996.
 
Van Beek, Gus W. "William Foxwell Albright: A Short Biography." In The Scholarship of William Foxwell Albright: An Appraisal, pp. 7-15. Brill, 1989.

External links

 Archaeology and the Hebrew patriarchs
 Archaeology and the prophets of Israel
 Light from archaeology on oral and written literature
National Academy of Sciences Biographical Memoir
 Official AIAR website
 Question and answer session with William F. Albright after his lecture, Archaeology and the Hebrew patriarchs
 William Foxwell Albright, in Historical Handbook of Major Biblical Interpreters

1891 births
1971 deaths
20th-century American male writers
20th-century American archaeologists
20th-century Christian biblical scholars
American orientalists
American biblical scholars
Critics of the Christ myth theory
Upper Iowa University alumni
Johns Hopkins University faculty
Archaeologists of the Near East
Biblical archaeologists
Johns Hopkins University alumni
American people of Cornish descent
Fellows of the American Academy of Arts and Sciences
Old Testament scholars
People from Coquimbo
American expatriates in Chile
American expatriates in Mandatory Palestine
Palestinologists
American United Methodists
Members of the United States National Academy of Sciences
Methodist biblical scholars
Corresponding Fellows of the British Academy